Dhevansoora is a 2018 Maldivian suspense thriller film written and directed by Yoosuf Shafeeu. Produced by Shafeeu, Ali Ahmed Shah and Ali Shazleem under Eupe Productions, the film stars Shafeeu, Mariyam Shifa, Ali Azim and Fathimath Azifa in pivotal roles. The film was released on 6 February 2018.

Plot 
The film starts with a woman telling a man that Shiyadha is betraying him, and have affair with other men. Just then two police officers come to Shiyan's house and find the corpse of his wife Shiyadha. The police arrest Shiyan for this murder. In the police station, Shiyan is interrogated about his wife's death, to which Shiyan replied that it was Shiyama (with whom Shiyan believed Dhiyadha is having an affair with) who killed her. In order to find Shiyam two police officers reach Shiyam's Island and learned that he left the house at the age of twenty and never returned

On the other hand, Police found a man named Mohammed Shiyam, who is believed to be Shiyadha's murderer. On interrogation, Shiyam revealed that Shiyadha is his wife and that they both got married in Sri Lanka. Shiyam decided to marry Siyadha after his first wife betrayed him. But Siyadha's parent was against this marriage. This happened to be the story Shiyan told the police. But still, police gave Shiyam a chance to defend himself. He revealed that one day when they ordered food and Shiyan was the delivery boy as the previous delivery boy was sick. Shiyan and Shiyadha bond together as they both share the same interest and Shiyan fell in love with her. Shiyam and Shiyadha left to Sri Lanka for their marriage and left Shiyan to take care of the house. When they returned to the Maldives Shiyadha revealed that Shiyan had made up a story that he and Shiyadha are married, and Shiyadha confronted Shiyan about this. That night, Shiyadha ordered food while Shiyam went to drink water and was attacked. When he gained consciousness he found Shiyan near Shiyadha's dead body telling him to run for his life.

The police find Shiyam's story logical and decided to put both Shiyan and Shiyam in one cell. In the cell Shiyan attacked Shiyam where as Shiyam begs him to tell the truth. The police tracked the actual delivery boy who told the police that Shiyan is a psycho who always acts very weird and talks to himself. He even revealed that Shiyan killed Shiyadha. Shiyan is proven guilty and Shiyam has been set free. On the other hand the police found a ID card with belongs to Hassan Shiyam who is none other than Shiyan himself. So the police realised that Shiyan has Multiple Personality Disorder which made him assume other personalities than his own. This is due to the trauma he had experienced in his childhood. Police brought Shiyam's mother hoping that he would confess his crime, but he only confess of not being able to help his mother and didn't tell anything about Shiyadha's murder. This made the police realise that Shiyam was not the culprit.

In an order to reveal the truth about Shiyadha's murder the police tried to force Shiyam' personality to overtake Shiyan's personality. Shiyam revealed that it was Vafir who killed Shiyadha. Vafir was the actual delivery boy who gave Shiyan to deliver the food as he wasn't well that day. Vafir accepts his crime and Shiyan is set free.

In the ending scene Shiyama tells Shiyan that she will alway remain as his shadow and will never leave him no matter what.

Cast 
 Yoosuf Shafeeu as Shiyan / Hassan Shiyam
 Mariyam Shifa as Shiyadha Najeeb
 Mohamed Faisal as Station Inspector Thoha. Leading officer of Shiyadha's murder case
 Ibrahim Jihad as Police Staff Sergeant Ahmed Shiyad
 Ahmed Saeed as Chief Superintendent Riyaz. Reporting officer of Shiyadha's murder case
 Nashidha Mohamed as Thuhufa, Shiyad's wife
 Ali Azim as Young Hassan Shiyam
 Ahmed Easa as Vafir, Shiyadha's actual murderer
 Jadhulla Ismail as Mohamed Shiyam, Shiyadha's husband
 Fathimath Azifa as Dr. Shiyama, Shiyan's so-called doctor
 Mariyam Shakeela as Shiyana, Shiyam's mother
 Ali Shazleem as Police Sergeant Anees
 Mohamed Waheed as Najeeb, Shiyadha's father
 Mariyam Haleem as Arifa, Shiyadha's mother
 Hamdhoon Farooq as Qalib
 Ibrahim Naseer as Shuaib
 Mohamed Hassan as Police Sergeant Zameer
 Ashraf Mohamed as Mujuthaba

Development
After the success of his previous comedy films, Baiveriyaa (2015) and Naughty 40 (2017), Shafeeu announced his next venture titled Dhevansoora, a suspense thriller, on 21 October 2017. On 30 October 2017, Shafeeu introduced debutant Mariyam Shifa in the lead role and praised her performance to be noteworthy. It was revealed that the film will feature 21 actors in several roles. Filming took place in Male', Hulhumale' and Villimale'.

Soundtrack

Release
It was initially planned to release the film in December 2017. The first teaser of the film along with posters, were released on 31 October 2017. The release date was shifted to February 2018, citing unavailability of Olympus Cinema during December 2017.

Accolades

Sequel
In February 2018, Shafeeu announced that he intended to develop a sequel of Dhevansoora, reprising the characters from the original.

References

2018 films
Maldivian thriller films
Films directed by Yoosuf Shafeeu